QLN may refer to: 

 QLN, the station code for Kollam Junction railway station, the second largest railway station in Kerala state of India
Quantum Learning Network, an education and training organization based in Oceanside, California